Die Ewigkeit is the second release from German electronic/darkwave band Relatives Menschsein.

Track listing
"Ausgeblutet"-4:39
"In Gedanken"-2:39
"Erfüllung"-5:01
"Leben"-3:44
"Passion"-4:34
"Verflucht"-7:12
"Die Ewigkeit"-6:28
"Tempel (Remastered Demo Version)"-3:07

Info
 All tracks written by Lissy Mödl
 Vocals by Amadeus
 Guitars by Jörg Wolfgram

References

External links
 Relatives Menschsein Discography Info

1993 albums
Alice In... albums
Relatives Menschsein albums